Bharat Itihas Sanshodhak Mandal, popularly known as Itihas Sanshodhak Mandal or just 'Mandal', is an Indian institute providing resources and training for historical researchers. It is located at Pune in Maharashtra state. The institute was founded in 1910 by the veteran Indian historian V. K. Rajwade and Sardar K. C. Mehendale.V.K.Rajwade founded 'Bharat Itihas Samshodhak Mangal in Pune, on 7 July 1910 to facilitate historical research.

Objective

The main objective behind setting up the Mandal was to provide ready resources to the historians and researchers, to save their time and to motivate them. Rajwade conceived this idea long back but could not fulfill it until Sardar Mehendale met him and on his own expressed his readiness to support him for anything that he wished to do for the betterment of history.

History

The Mandal was founded on 7 July 1910 by the veteran Indian historian Vishwanath Kashinath Rajwade and Sardar Khanderao Chintaman Mehendale at Sardar Mehendale's palace at Appa Balwant Chowk in Pune. To commence the activity Rajwade read an essay in the presence of the only listener Sardar Mehendale. Later on, the Mandal moved to its present building located in Sadashiv Peth area in the heart of the city. In March 1926 the short tempered Rajwade left Pune due to differences with the then Administrators of the Mandal and shifted to Dhule to form another institute which was named after him as 'Rajwade Sanshodhan Mandir'. The Mandal at Pune, however, continued following on its mission to help researchers and contribute to the progress of historical study. It has since then been highly supported by the people and scholars by way of donations and bequests of books and papers. Rajwade's disciples Datto Vaman Potdar, Ganesh Hari Khare and Vasudeo Sitaram Bendrey are believed to have played major role in prospering the Mandal and its activities.

Resources

Presently, the Mandal maintains more than 1,500,000 historical papers and  scripts mainly in Marathi, Modi, Persian, Portuguese and English. The Mandal'''s library keeps more than  books written mainly in Marathi and English, which can be made available to the researchers for free consultation or, for a nominal fee, on 'Take Home' basis. These resources hold sizeable volumes on the history of the Maratha Empire, Maratha culture and Marathi literature. They also contain a large collection of the material on British Rule as well as Mughal Rule over India. The Mandal issues a Quarterly Journal called 'Trai-Masik' wherein essays and articles on new discoveries are presented. It has also published books written and edited by veteran historians and reports of annual conferences and historians' meets. The Mandal periodically organises lectures, workshops, training, seminars and study tours for the young researchers and historians.

Funding
It was reported in 2004 that the Mandal was insufficiently funded to micro-film or digitise its collection. In 2009, as it entered its 100th year, it planned to create a permanent fund of Ten Million Rupees and use the interest from this fund to pay its expenses.

Past presidents

1910–1913 Ganesh Vyankatesh Joshi
1913–1926 Kashinath Narayan Sane
1926–1935 Chintaman Vinayak Vaidya
1935–1942 Narsinha Chintaman Kelkar
1942–1950 Malojirao Naik Nimbalkar
1950–1974 Datto Vaman Potdar
1974–1981 Ganesh Hari Khare
1981–1983 Hasmukh Dhirajlal Sankalia
1984–1986 Ramchandra Shankar Walimbe
1988–1991 Vishwanath Trimbak Shete.

Select publicationsAlbum of PaintingsAnnual Research ReportsBibliography and Index of Mandal's PublicationsMiscellaneous Articles on Indian HistoryProceedings on Researches on PuneProceedings of the Annual ConferencesQuarterly JournalsVijayanagar Commemoration VolumeSadhan ChikitsaRecords and sourcesRecords of the Shivaji's PeriodPersian Sources of Indian History; by G. H. KhareMiscellaneous Sources of Indian HistorySources of Maratha History; by V. K. RajwadeSources of the Medieval History of the Deccan''

References

'Quarterly Journal', January 1991 published by Bharat Itihas Sabshodhak Mandal, Pune
'Rajwade Lekhsangraha' (Marathi) published by Sahitya Akademi

External links
250 ayurveda-related manuscripts digitised
Sakaal Times
Research on historical documents written in Modi script

Education in Pune
1910 establishments in India
Historiography of India